Lygephila pallida is a moth of the family Erebidae first described by Andreas Bang-Haas in 1907. It is found in central and eastern Turkey.

References

Moths described in 1907
Toxocampina
Insects of Turkey